Charles Alexander Aitken (born 1 May 1942 in Edinburgh, Scotland) is a Scottish former footballer.

Aitken is the all-time record appearance holder at English club Aston Villa. He played for Villa from August 1959 until May 1976, a period of 17 seasons. He came to Villa to accompany his friend Wilson Briggs, also a left back, to a trial. They were both taken on, but Briggs ended up playing just two games in his career. Aitken was a member of the 1975 League Cup winning team, having been a runner-up in 1971. He spent the last two seasons of his professional career in the NASL with the New York Cosmos, playing alongside the greats of Pelé and Franz Beckenbauer.

Aston Villa Honours
Football League Second Division
Runners-up: 1974–75

Football League Third Division
Champions: 1971–72

Football League Cup
Winners: 1975
Runners-up: 1963, 1971

FA Charity Shield
Runners-up: 1972

Aston Villa Career Statistics

References

External links

nasljerseys.com with Aitken's North American statistics
Aston Villa Player Database

1942 births
Living people
Aston Villa F.C. players
Expatriate soccer players in the United States
Association football defenders
New York Cosmos players
North American Soccer League (1968–1984) players
Footballers from Edinburgh
Scottish expatriate footballers
Scottish expatriate sportspeople in the United States
Scottish footballers
English Football League players
Scotland under-23 international footballers